Cache Creek is an arroyo (dry wash) in the western Tehachapi Pass and Mojave Desert areas of Kern County, southern California.

The arroyo's intermittent creek flows seasonally from watersheds in the northeastern Tehachapi Mountains and southeastern Sierra Nevada foothills, and from infrequent rains as flash floods, ending in the Mojave Desert.

Settlement
A small , known as Cache Creek, is located on the Cache Creek wash in the Mojave Desert, at the intersection of Cache Creek Road and California State Route 58 (Tehachapi Pass road) northeast of the town of Mojave.

See also

References

Rivers of Kern County, California
Mojave Desert
Tehachapi Mountains
Populated places in the Mojave Desert
Unincorporated communities in Kern County, California
Rivers of Southern California